Robert Lyall "Alfie" Hannaford , (born 9 November 1944) is an Australian realist artist notable for his drawings, paintings, portraits and sculptures. He is a great-great-great-grandson of Susannah Hannaford.

Family
Hannaford was born and grew up on his family's farm in the Gilbert Valley near Riverton, South Australia, attending Riverton Primary and High Schools. Born to Claude and Vera (née Hoare), he has two elder brothers (Ian and Donald) and a younger sister (Kay).

In 1960, aged 16, he moved to Adelaide to complete his schooling at Prince Alfred College.  He met Kate Gilfillan in 1964. In 1967–68 he studied in Ballarat, marrying Kate in 1968. They moved to Melbourne in 1969 living there for four years, where their two children Tom and Georgina were born. They divorced in 1976.

He returned to South Australia in 1974 living in Riverton, Adelaide, Kangaroo Island, and from 1981–87, West Hindmarsh. In 1984 his daughter Aisha was born and in 1987 his daughter Tsering was born.

Hannaford bought a disused farmhouse and outbuildings at Peters Hill near Riverton and commenced converting them into a dwelling and studio, where he now lives with his wife, artist Alison Mitchell. They were married in 2007 and own and operate Riverton Light Gallery.  and have exhibited in collaborative exhibitions.

In 2006 Hannaford was diagnosed with an aggressive cancer.

On 1 January 2001 Hannaford (of West Hindmarsh) was awarded the Centenary Medal "For service to the community through art". On 9 June 2014 Hannaford (of Riverton) was appointed a Member of the Order of Australia (AM) "For significant service to the visual arts as a painter and sculptor". Also in 2014 he received the Premier's Award for Lifetime Achievement at the Ruby Awards.

Hannaford's youngest daughter, Tsering, is also a notable South Australian artist. Like her father, she specializes in portraiture, landscapes and still life, and has been a finalist for the Archibald prize. She became a full-time artist in 2013.

Career
Although self-taught, Hannaford has benefited from the mentoring of South Australian artists Hans Heysen and Ivor Hele. He worked as political cartoonist for the Adelaide Advertiser from 1964 to 1967 (between Pat Oliphant and Michael Atchison), before becoming a full-time artist in 1970.

Primarily known as a portrait artist, depicting the likes of Dame Joan Sutherland, Donald Bradman, Paul Keating, and Bob Hawke, he is also known for his landscapes, still lifes, nudes, and sculptures. He has commented on his portraiture that: "Portraiture is an exploration of character that goes beyond photography. It is an ongoing thing over a long period of time. You get elements of various emotions that can be sensed in the painting."

Hannaford first entered the Archibald Prize in 1991 with a portrait of Hugh Stretton. The portrait was shortlisted, and won the 1991/1992 People's Choice Award. To 2018, 26 of his entries have been finalists in 21 of the competitions, and he has been a three-time winner of the People's Choice Award – in 1992, 1996 and 1998.

"Black Chicks Talking" Project
"Black Chicks Talking" was a project conceived by the actor Leah Purcell and her partner Bain Stewart, and developed by their production company Bungabura Productions. At the invitation of Stewart, in the period 1999 to 2002 Hannaford painted 10 portraits of noted Australian indigenous women to support the project which had been presented to Hannaford as an initiative to raise funds for a mentoring scheme for young Indigenous people. In order to keep the portraits together as a group, they were donated to the Tweed River Gallery.

The ten subjects of the portraits are:

Commissions
 1972 - Sir Donald Bradman for the Marylebone Cricket Club
 1977 - Dame Joan Sutherland for the Elizabethan Theatre Trust (Image)
 1977 - Elma Casely for the University of South Australia
 1980 - John Jefferson Bray for the University of Adelaide
 1982 - Brodie Thomas Howard for the Howard Family fifth generation Kangaroo Island and current winemaker for Dudley Wines
 1997 - Paul Keating for Historic Memorials Committee, Parliament House, Canberra
 1998 - Bronze sculpture of Sir Donald Bradman located in the Creswell Gardens (adjacent to the eastern entrance to the Adelaide Oval), for Adelaide City Council
 2000 - Bob Hawke for the Bob Hawke Prime Ministerial Library, University of South Australia
 2001 - The Centenary of Federation 2001 painting, commissioned by the Australian Government
 2010 - Bronze sculpture of Roy Rene, located on Hindley Street, Adelaide, commissioned by Adelaide City Council
 2012 - Bronze sculpture of Simpson and his donkey, located in the Angas Gardens (north-east of Creswell Gardens), commissioned by Defence Force Health Services
 2013 - Bronze sculptures for Aboriginal and Torres Strait Islander War Memorial, located adjacent to the Torrens Parade Ground (Image)
 2015 - Bronze bust of Sir William Henry Bragg on North Terrace in front of Government House, Adelaide

Other portraits on public display
 1978 - Sir Thomas Playford, Department of Premier and Cabinet, Adelaide
 1978 - Alexander Maurice Ramsay, National Portrait Gallery, Canberra
 1985 - Gavin Walkley, St Mark's College, North Adelaide
 1987 - Tom (Hannaford), Tweed River Art Gallery (Image)
 2001 - Jack Mundey, Sydney Living Museums (Image)
 2004 - Stephen Codrington, Prince Alfred College, Adelaide
 2006 - Lowitja O'Donoghue, National Portrait Gallery, Canberra (Image)
 2007 - John Bannon, St Mark's College, North Adelaide
Vice-Chancellors of the University of Adelaide, Mitchell Building, Adelaide
Geoffrey Badger (1967–1977)
Donald Stranks (1977–1986)

Recognition, honours and awards
 1990 - Winner Doug Moran Portrait Prize, portrait of Riverton identity Bill (Francis Hogan) with Hannaford's dog Ochre, Tweed River Art Gallery
 1992 - People's Choice Award at the Archibald Prize, 1991/92 with a portrait of Australian historian and professor Hugh Stretton
 1996 - People's Choice Award at the Archibald Prize, 1996 with a self-portrait
 1998 - People's Choice Award at the Archibald Prize, 1998 with a portrait of academic Rolf Prince
 1998 - Inaugural winner of the Fleurieu Art Prize
 2001 - Centenary Medal 
 2014 - Member of the Order of Australia
 2014 - Lifetime Achievement prize at Ruby Awards

Archibald Prize finalist

Hannaford's work has been selected as an Archibald Prize finalist many times:
 1992 - Portrait of Hugh Stretton (Winner: People's Choice 1991/92)
 1993 - Peter van Rood (Image)
 1993 - Max Harris
 1994 - Self Portrait
 1994 - The Lord Mayor
 1995 - Jarinyanu David Downs, National Portrait Gallery, Canberra (Image)
 1995 - Self Portrait
 1996 - Self Portrait (Winner: People's Choice 1996)
 1996 - Cheryl Hurst
 1997 - Paul Davies
 1998 - Paul Keating (Image)
 1998 - Rolf Prince (Winner: People's Choice 1998) (Image)
 1999 - Robert Dessaix (in my studio), National Portrait Gallery, Canberra (Image)
 2001 - Richard Maurovic
 2002 - Lynda Syddick Napaltjarri (Image)
 2003 - Rabbi Raymond Apple (Image)
 2004 - Self-portrait (Image)
 2005 - Bob Brown (Image)
 2006 - Tim Flannery (Image) 
 2007 - Tubes (Self-portrait) {Image}
 2008 - Alison Mitchell (portrait of artist's wife) (Image) 
 2009 - Self-portrait (Image)
 2010 - Malcolm Fraser (Image)
 2015 - Self-portrait (Image)
 2017 - Michael Chaney (Image)
 2018 - Self-portrait (Image)

2022 – Self-portrait

Archibald Salon des Refusés

The Archibald Salon des Refusés is an exhibition which shows Archibald Prize entries that have been selected to hang in the prize exhibition.
2011 - Trevor Jamieson (People's Choice Award)
2012 - Ned Cheedy (Image)
2014 - Phillip Adams
2016 - Self-portrait

References

External links
 Artist's web site
 Riverton Light Gallery
 ABC News article
 ABC TV Sunday Arts
 Adelaide Now Article
 Michael Cathcart, "Robert Hannaford", 10 April 2001, www.abc.net.au
 Mike Sexton, "Hannaford celebrates art and life", 3 January 2008, www.abc.net.au
 Petria Ladgrove, "Robert Hannaford: portraits of a family, 19 May 2011, www.abc.net.au
 Chelsea Ashmeade "Robert 'Alfie' Hannaford's 'woman and child' statue unveiled, 26 September 2016, Northern Argus

1944 births
Living people
Australian painters
Doug Moran National Portrait Prize winners
People from Riverton, South Australia
Archibald Prize finalists
Archibald Prize People's Choice Award winners
Archibald Prize Salon des Refusés
Archibald Prize Salon des Refusés People's Choice Award winners
People educated at Prince Alfred College
21st-century Australian sculptors